The Pracuúba River is a river of the state of Pará, Brazil.

Course

The river is on the island of Marajó to the northwest of Belém in the delta region where the Amazon and Tocantins rivers empty into the Atlantic Ocean.
It runs through part of the  Terra Grande-Pracuúba Extractive Reserve, a sustainable use conservation unit created in 2006.
Access to the Pracuúba and the nearby Canaticú River is difficult during the summer dry season.
The communities on these rivers have an açaí palm crop that ripens in the winter, between seasons in other areas, which therefore commands a high price.

See also
List of rivers of Pará

References

Sources

Rivers of Pará